The 2008–09 Florida State Seminoles men's basketball team represented Florida State University in the 2008–2009 NCAA Division I basketball season. The Seminoles were coached by Leonard Hamilton and played their home games at the Donald L. Tucker Center in Tallahassee, Florida. The Seminoles were a member of the Atlantic Coast Conference.

The Seminoles finished the season 25–10, 10–6 in ACC play. They lost in the quarterfinals of the 2009 ACC men's basketball tournament. They received and at–large bid to the 2009 NCAA Division I men's basketball tournament, earning the No. 5 seed in the East Region, where they lost to No. 12 seed Wisconsin in the first round.

Roster

Source

Schedule and results

|-
!colspan=9 style="background:#; color:white;"| Regular season

|-
!colspan=9 style="background:#; color:white;"| ACC tournament

|-
!colspan=9 style="background:#; color:white;"| NCAA tournament

Rankings

References

External links
Almanac
Statistics

Florida State Seminoles
Florida State
Florida State Seminoles men's basketball seasons